Fulton is an unincorporated community and census-designated place located in the town of Fulton, Rock County, Wisconsin, United States. The Yahara River empties into the Rock River just downstream of Fulton. The community was first named a CDP at the 2020 census, which showed a population of 117.

Demographics

References

Unincorporated communities in Wisconsin
Unincorporated communities in Rock County, Wisconsin
Census-designated places in Wisconsin
Census-designated places in Rock County, Wisconsin